Princess Royal Channel is a channel in the North Coast region of the Canadian province of British Columbia, separating Princess Royal Island from the mainland. The southern half of the channel is also called Graham Reach, and the northern half Fraser Reach.

The southern half of the channel was first charted by George Vancouver in 1793 with his ships Discovery and Chatham, which anchored about mid-way up the channel; James Johnstone, one of Vancouver's lieutenants, charted its northern half the same summer.

References

External links

Channels of British Columbia
North Coast of British Columbia